Josef Hilmar Jørgensen (March 28, 1892 – November 2, 1961) was a Norwegian organ builder.

Jørgensen was the owner of the J. H. Jørgensen organ company. The company was originally called Olsen & Jørgensen from 1892 to 1925 (Jørgensen's partner Olsen had already withdrawn from work at the company in 1912).

Personal life
Jørgensen was born in Oslo, the son of the organ builder Jens Henrik Jørgensen (1864–1946) and his wife Marie Guldbrandsen (1869–1911). On May 16, 1922 he married Annette Wirstad (1894–1991), the daughter of the wholesaler Ole Olsen Wirstad (1846–1923) and Karen Hansen (1855–?). The couple's daughter Anne Marie Jørgensen is married to the politician Kåre Willoch. Jørgensen died in Oslo.

References

Further reading
 Stein Johannes Kolness. 1987. Norsk orgelkultur: instrument og miljø frå mellomalderen til i dag. Oslo: Det Norske samlaget.
 Einar Hoffstad (ed.). 1938. Illustrert norsk næringsleksikon, vol. 1. Oslo: Yrkesforlaget.

Norwegian pipe organ builders
20th-century Norwegian businesspeople
Recipients of the King's Medal of Merit in gold
Businesspeople from Oslo
1892 births
1961 deaths
Musical instrument manufacturing companies of Norway